The following table is a list of films produced in Denmark or in the Danish language during the 1970s. For an alphabetical list of all Danish films currently on Wikipedia see :Category:Danish films. For Danish films from other decades see the Cinema of Denmark box above.

External links
 Danish film at the Internet Movie Database

1970s
Films
Danish

da:Danske film
nl:Lijst van Deense films